Bodianus perditio, the golden-spot hogfish, is a species of wrasse. 
It is found in the Pacific Ocean.

Size

Etymology
The fish is named for ruin or destruction, referring to precarious position of the corvette Astrolabe, which stranded on the reefs of Tonga in the South Pacific. Quoy facing the “perdition” in which the ship, the crew and all the specimens that had been collected would be lost,  resolutely stuck to the work of illustrating this species. The ship, the crew and the illustration survived but the type specimen did not.

References

perditio
Fish of the Pacific Ocean

Taxa named by Jean René Constant Quoy
Taxa named by Joseph Paul Gaimard
Fish described in 1834